"Before the Law" (German: "Vor dem Gesetz") is a parable contained in the novel The Trial, by Franz Kafka. "Before the Law" was published twice in Kafka's lifetime, first in the 1915 New Year's edition of the independent Jewish weekly Selbstwehr, then in 1919 as part of the collection Ein Landarzt (A Country Doctor). The Trial, however, was not published until 1925, after Kafka's death.

Plot summary

"Before the Law"
A man from the country seeks "the law" and wishes to gain entry to it through an open doorway, but the doorkeeper tells the man that he cannot go through at the present time. The man asks if he can ever go through, and the doorkeeper says it is possible "but not now (jetzt aber nicht)". The man waits by the door for years, bribing the doorkeeper with everything he has. The doorkeeper accepts the bribes, but tells the man he only accepts them "so that you do not think you have left anything undone". The man does not attempt to murder or hurt the doorkeeper to gain entry to the law, but waits at the doorway until he is about to die. Right before his death, he asks the doorkeeper why, even though everyone seeks the law, no one else has come in all the years he has been there. The doorkeeper answers, "No one else could ever be admitted here, since this gate was made only for you. I am now going to shut it."

In The Trial
Josef K has to show an important client from Italy around a cathedral. The client does not show up, but just as K is leaving the cathedral, the priest calls out K's name, although K has never met the priest. The priest reveals that he is a court employee, and he tells K the story (Before the Law), prefacing it by saying it is from "the opening paragraphs [introductory] to the Law". The priest and K then discuss interpretations of the story before K leaves the cathedral.

References in other works

The parable is referenced and reworked in the penultimate chapter of J. M. Coetzee's novel Elizabeth Costello (2003).

Jacques Derrida's essay of the same title examines the meta-fictional aspects of the structure and content of Kafka's fable, such as the placing of the title before the body of the text and also within the first line of the text itself. Derrida incorporates Immanuel Kant's notion of the categorical imperative as well as Freudian psychoanalysis in his reading of Kafka's fable.

The 1990 Robert Anton Wilson book Quantum Psychology contains a parable about Before the Law.

The 1985 Martin Scorsese film After Hours features a scene which parodies this parable.

The post-rock band Long Distance Calling uses the spoken animated introduction sequence from the Orson Welles film adaptation of The Trial in the track "Fire in the Mountain" from their 2007 album Satellite Bay.

American composer Arnold Rosner created "Parable of the Law", a work for baritone singer and orchestra, based on Kafka's parable.

Giorgio Agamben references the parable in his book, Homo Sacer: Sovereign Power and Bare Life.

Mandy Patinkin's character references the parable in an episode of The Good Fight.

References

External links

 An English translation of 'Before the Law'.
 

Short stories by Franz Kafka
Short stories about law
1915 short stories